Rayerschied is an Ortsgemeinde – a municipality belonging to a Verbandsgemeinde, a kind of collective municipality – in the Rhein-Hunsrück-Kreis (district) in Rhineland-Palatinate, Germany. It belongs to the Verbandsgemeinde Simmern-Rheinböllen, whose seat is in Simmern.

Geography

Location
The residential municipality lies in the Hunsrück between Pleizenhausen and Bergenhausen 7 km from Simmern.

History
In 1204, Rayerschied had its first documentary mention in a donation document from the Kumbd Convent. From 1420, the village belonged to the Amt of Simmern, and later also to Palatinate-Simmern. In 1498, the village was mentioned as Reinßrath. In 1673, Rayerschied passed to Electoral Palatinate. Beginning in 1794, Rayerschied lay under French rule. In 1814 it was assigned to the Kingdom of Prussia at the Congress of Vienna. Since 1946, it has been part of the then newly founded state of Rhineland-Palatinate.

Politics

Municipal council
The council is made up of 6 council members, who were elected by majority vote at the municipal election held on 7 June 2009, and the honorary mayor as chairman.

Mayor
Rayerschied's mayor is José Miguel Nieves Päschkes.

Coat of arms
The municipality's arms might be described thus: Under a chief lozengy argent and azure, per pale gules a stork statant of the first and argent a cross sable.

Culture and sightseeing

Buildings
The following are listed buildings or sites in Rhineland-Palatinate’s Directory of Cultural Monuments:
 Saint John of Nepomuk Catholic Church (Kirche St. Johannes Nepomuk), Kirchstraße 2 – Gothic Revival brick building, 1896; before the church a sandstone beam cross, early 19th century; in the parish garden a Baroque baptismal font basin holder

Ancient sites
There are also barrows in Rayerschied.

References

External links
Municipality’s official webpage 

Rhein-Hunsrück-Kreis